The prix du roman Fnac is a French literary award established in 2002 by the retail chain Fnac.

List of winners  

FNAC
Awards established in 2002
2002 establishments in France